The Olympic Center is a sports complex in Lake Placid, New York that acted as the Olympic Park for both the 1932 and the 1980 Winter Olympics. The venues inside this area is the main complex of the 2023 Winter World University Games.

Venues

Current
Conference Center at Lake Placid – With 90,000 square feet of flexible meeting space, this convention center was opened in May 2011. It is directly connected to the Jack Shea Arena and the Herb Brooks Arena. Among other features, it is handicapped accessible, has a full-service production kitchen, state-of-the-art lighting systems, stages along with backstage dressing rooms and storage space, loading docks, and a 9,000-square-foot ballroom.
Herb Brooks Arena – Built for the 1980 Winter Olympics, this venue was formerly known as the Olympic Center arena.
Jack Shea Arena – Built for the 1932 Winter Olympics, Jack Shea Arena, also known as the 1932 Rink, was the first indoor arena used for the Winter Olympics. For the 1932 Games, it hosted the figure skating competition and six of the twelve ice hockey games.
James B. Sheffield Olympic Skating Rink – Built for the 1932 Olympics, this outdoor speed skating oval hosted the  1932 and 1980 Olympic speed skating competitions and served as the Olympic Stadium of the 1932 games, and hosted the opening ceremonies of that games. It also hosted other events during the 1932 games,  such as Ice hockey and Cross-country skiing.
USA Rink – One of three ice surfaces at the Olympic Center, this rink was built for the 1980 Winter Olympics.

Other facilities 
 Lake Placid Middle/High School – Located in the heart of the Olympic Center, the school building was utilized in both 1932 and 1980 for the Winter Olympic Games. In 1932 its classrooms and other spaces were used as dressing rooms for athletes competing in the Olympic Center. In 1980 it served as the main press center.
Lake Placid Winter Olympic Museum – Opened in 1994, the Lake Placid Winter Olympic Museum is a museum dedicated to the Winter Olympics. It is the only Olympic museum in North America. and is a part of the work of New York State Olympic Regional Development Authority in the Lake Placid Olympic Region. The museum receives between 25,000 and 35,000 visitors annually.

Former
Lake Placid Convention Center 
Lussi Ice Rink – The Lussi Ice Rink was a practice rink and convention space within the former Lake Placid Convention Center. The  rink was built for the 1980 games.
Olympic ticket center – A building was constructed at the Olympic Center along Main Street between the arenas and the speed skating oval to house ticket sales for the 1980 games. It is now a retail space housing a local business.
North Elba Town Hall – North Elba's town hall, located directly across from the Olympic Center,  temporarily acted as a part of the complex during the 1932 games, housing the Olympic Organizing headquarters. It again acted as part of the campus during the 1980 Olympics when it served as the host building for the scoring and official systems and the Lake Placid 1980 Winter Olympic Organizing Committee.

Use

Events

Annual events
Ironman Lake Placid
Lake Placid Marathon
 The Lake Placid ice dance competition
Winter Empire State Games

Notable events

Multi-sport competitions
1932 Winter Olympics
1972 Winter Universiade
1980 Winter Olympics
2000 Winter Goodwill Games
2023 Winter World University Games

Curling
1987 United States Men's Curling Championship

Figure skating
U.S. Figure Skating Championships: 1965
Skate America: 1979, 1981, 1982, 2009

Ice hockey
ECAC Hockey men's championship: 1993, 1994, 1995, 1996, 1997, 1998, 1999, 2000, 2001, 2002, 2014, 2015, 2016, 2017, 2018, 2019
Ice Hockey tournament (and Olympic test event) in December 1979
NCAA Division I Men's Ice Hockey Championship (aka the Frozen Four): 1970, 1984, 1988
2007 NCAA National Collegiate Women's Ice Hockey Tournament

Future events
2023 Winter World University Games

Speed skating
1932 World Allround Speed Skating Championships
1978 World Sprint Speed Skating Championships for Men
1978 World Sprint Speed Skating Championships for Women
1989 World Allround Speed Skating Championships for Women

Training
The venues in the complex have been used as training centers for United States Olympic athletes.

Dorothy Hamill trained in the 1932 Arena prior to her gold medal performance at the 1976 Winter Olympics.

See also
Lake Placid Olympic Sports Complex
Venues of the 1932 Winter Olympics
Venues of the 1980 Winter Olympics

References

External links

1931 establishments in New York (state)
Indoor ice hockey venues in New York (state)
Sports in Lake Placid, New York
Sports venues completed in 1932
Sports venues in Essex County, New York
Venues of the 1932 Winter Olympics
Venues of the 1980 Winter Olympics
Olympic Parks